The 2021 season was the Seattle Seahawks' 46th season in the National Football League (NFL), their 20th playing their home games at their current venue, Lumen Field, as well as their 12th under head coach Pete Carroll.

The Seahawks failed to improve on the previous year's 12–4 record after their Week 7 loss to the New Orleans Saints, and after their 10–20 loss to division rival Los Angeles Rams in Week 15, the Seahawks suffered their first losing season since 2011, and their first and only losing season in the Russell Wilson era. Following their Week 16 loss to the Chicago Bears, the Seahawks suffered their first double digit losing season since 2009, finished last in their division for the first time since 1996 when they played in the AFC West, and were eliminated from playoff contention for the first time since 2017.

The Seahawks continued to struggle defensively from the previous year ranking dead last in total yards allowed, giving up a total of 2,254 yards in the first five games of season and were on pace to give up the most yards in a season in NFL history for the second straight year. Overall, the Seahawks allowed 6,445 yards, or 379.1 per game. Russell Wilson also missed a game for the first time in his career, missing three games after injuring his middle finger in Week 5 against the Rams.

This was the first season since 2010 without longtime linebacker K. J. Wright, who signed with the Las Vegas Raiders on September 6, 2021. It was also the last season with quarterback Russell Wilson and linebacker Bobby Wagner on the roster. Wagner was released on March 9, 2022, and signed a five-year contract worth up to $65 million with the defending Super Bowl LVI champion Los Angeles Rams on March 31, while Wilson was traded to the Denver Broncos along with a 4th round pick for quarterback Drew Lock, defensive lineman Shelby Harris, tight end Noah Fant, two first-round picks, two second-round picks and a fifth round pick on March 16. Both were the last remaining members from their 2013 Super Bowl-winning season on the roster.

Draft

Notes
 The Seahawks traded safety Bradley McDougald, first- and third-round selections, and a 2022 first-round selection to the New York Jets in exchange for Jamal Adams and a 2022 fourth-round selection.
 The Seahawks traded their fourth-round selection (No. 129) to the Tampa Bay Buccaneers in exchange for the Bucaneers' fourth-round selection (No. 137) and a sixth-round compensatory selection (No. 217).
 The Seahawks traded their fifth-round selection to the Las Vegas Raiders in exchange for offensive guard Gabe Jackson.
 The Seahawks traded a sixth-round selection to the Miami Dolphins in exchange for a 2020 seventh-round selection. This selection was traded to the Chicago Bears. The Bears traded this selection back to the Seahawks in exchange for a sixth-round selection (No. 217), originally from the Tampa Bay Buccaneers, and the Seahawks' seventh-round selection (No. 250).
 The Seahawks received safety Quandre Diggs and a seventh-round selection from the Detroit Lions in exchange for a 2020 fifth-round selection.
 The Seahawks traded center B. J. Finney and the Detroit Lions's seventh-round selection to Cincinnati Bengals for defensive end Carlos Dunlap.

Staff

Final roster

<noinclude>

Preseason
The Seahawks' preseason schedule was announced on May 12.

Regular season

Schedule
The Seahawks' regular season schedule was announced on May 12.

Note: Intra-division opponents are in bold text.

Game summaries

Week 1: at Indianapolis Colts

Week 2: vs. Tennessee Titans

Week 3: at Minnesota Vikings
This would be Seattle's first loss to the Vikings since 2009.

Week 4: at San Francisco 49ers

Week 5: vs. Los Angeles Rams

Week 6: at Pittsburgh Steelers

Week 7: vs. New Orleans Saints

Week 8: vs. Jacksonville Jaguars

Week 10: at Green Bay Packers

This was the first time the Seahawks were shutout in a game since Week 2 of the 2011 against the Pittsburgh Steelers. Russell Wilson return from finger injury.

Week 11: vs. Arizona Cardinals

Week 12: at Washington Football Team

Week 13: vs. San Francisco 49ers

Week 14: at Houston Texans

Week 15: at Los Angeles Rams

Week 16: vs. Chicago Bears

With the loss, the Seahawks were eliminated from the playoff contention for the first time since 2017.

Week 17: vs. Detroit Lions

Week 18: at Arizona Cardinals

That is the last game that Russell Wilson is a Seahawks Quarterback because the following season, he got traded to the Denver Broncos for their 2022 season.

Standings

Division

Conference

References

External links

Seattle
Seattle Seahawks seasons
Seattle Seahawks
Seattle Seahawks